Poove Unakkaga (பூவே உனக்காக is a 2020-2022 Indian-Tamil language soap opera. It premiered on 10 August 2020 on Sun TV and ended on 18 June 2022 with 572 episodes. It is available for worldwide streaming on Sun NXT. The Show was produced by Sun Entertainment and Mindset Media. It stars Mohammed Azeem, Varshini Arza and Chaya Singh.

Synopsis
Keerthi (Jovita Livingston Jones) and Poovarasi (Raadhika Preethi) are best friends and are shown to share everything. Keerthi and Poovarasi both fall in love with Kathir (Arun). Kathir is in love with Keerthi. When Keerthi learns that Poovarasi also loves Kadhir she sacrifices her love for her friend. Poovarasi does not know about this and marries Kathir. The day after her wedding night she learns that Keerthi and Kathir were lovers and Keerthi sacrificed her love for Poovarasi. After knowing that, Poovarasi wants to unite Kadhir with Keerthi so she tries to apply for divorce. The advocate asks them to remain united for a year. Meanwhile Keerthi forgets her past life because of an accident. Poovarasi takes care of her and wants to unite Keerthi and Kathir when she regains her memory.

Unexpectedly one day Keerthi kills herself by walking into the ocean. Then it is revealed that Keerthi faked her death and is still alive and she mentions "I will come back when Kathir and Poovarasi have a baby". After Keerthi's supposed death Poovarasi and Kathir fall in love and Poovarasi becomes pregnant, but Kathir suspects Poovarasi and claims he is not the father of the baby. Poovarasi humiliates him by removing her nuptial chain and throwing it in Kathir's face. He starts to hate Poovarasi and her family. He and his mom make plans to destroy Poovarasi's family, but one day Rathinavalli (Poovarasi's mother) overhears this, so Kathir, his mother and Maheswari (Devipriya) kill Rathinavalli (Aamani)

Meanwhile it is revealed that Kathir (Mohammed Azeem) wasn’t the one who killed Rathinavali. It was revealed that his mother and Maheswari were the ones who killed her.
 
But, one day, the nurse who changed the DNA report bribed by Maheswari informed Kathir about the DNA report that the unborn child in Poovarasi’s tummy is Kathir’s, where he feels guilty for thinking wrong of her and is also informed that Maheswari was responsible for the DNA test report change. 
 
Then, Kathir furiously comes to attack Maheswari in the night at a deserted place who reveals to her that she was the one responsible of changing the report. Maheswari is attacked by Kathir and reveals that his mother was the one who instructed Maheswari to change the report. Kathir then tells Maheshwari that he is going to reveal the truth of her evil doings like changing the DNA report. Maheshwari then viciously attacks Kathir and his mom and buries their unconscious bodies. They are rescued by Karthik, another man who is in a one-sided love relationship with Poovarasi, who is unaware that she is married. 

Kathir knows that he cannot re-enter the family normally because Poovarasi won't accept him, so he decides to come in the guise of an old man to be Poovarasi's bodyguard to protect her from Maheshwari. The entire family immediately begins to like the old man, but one day his disguise is revealed but despite saving her life many times, Poovarasi still rejects him and orders him to leave the house.Then Kathir met with an accident. Ranjana takes him to her house and cares for him. Ranjana proposed to Kathir. But Kathir rejected her proposal. Ranjana and Kathir planned to unite Poovarasi with Kathir. The plan works. Kathir and Poovarasi unite.

Cast

Main 
Arun / Mohammed Azeem as Kathiravan Shivanarayanan
Radhika Preethi / Varshini Arza as Poovarasi Kathiravan  
Chaya Singh as Ranjana Chokkalingam

Recurring 
 Devipriya as Maheshwari
 Sudha Ramanujam / Kiruba Krishnamurti as Rajalakshmi Shivanarayanan
 B. Jayalakshmi as Jayanthi 
 Shyam as Muthuvel
 Subathra as Padhmavathi
 Jovita Livingston Jones as Keerthi 
 Srinish Aravind as Karthick Subramanian (Dead)
 Aamani as Rathanavalli Senthamizhselvan (Dead)
 Arun Kumar Rajan as Selvam
 Vignesh as Shakthivel
 Rekha Nair as Thangam
 Srilekha Rajendran as Mariamma
 Sridevi Ashok as Dhanalakshmi
 Suraj PS Naidu Busted as Kesavan
 G. M. Kumar as Shankaralingam 
 Usha Elizabeth as Karpagam (Dead)
 Premalatha as Lakshmi  
 Dhaswanth as Gunasekar
 Rajkanth as Nagaraj 
 Meena Sellamuthu as Constable Kannamma 
 Ajay Rathnam as Shivanarayanan (Dead)
 Rajkumar as Senthamizhselvan
 Arun Raja as Maridurai

Casting 
 Actress Reshma Venkatesh was initially supposed to play the role of Keerthi. But, she quit. So the storyline was completely changed.  Actor  J. Livingston's daughter Jovita Livingston Jones played the lead role. But in March 2021, she quit.
 Kannada Actress Raadhika Preethi was selected to play Poovarasi. But in February 2022, she was replaced by Actress Varshini Arza.
 A newcomer Actor Arun was selected to play a male lead role Kathir. But In June 2021, he was replaced by Actor Mohamed Azeem.
 Later, Actor Srinish Aravind was cast as Karthi. But in August 2021, he quit the series due to COVID-19.
 Besides Arun Kumar Rajan, Aamani, Rajkumar, Vignesh, Devipriya, Sudha Ramanujam, Kiruba Krishnamurti, Sridevi Ashok, B. Jayalakshmi, Rekha Nair and others played supporting roles.

Special and crossover episodes 
 A special episode showed Kathir and Poovarasi's marriage.
 A crossover episode showed Roja which was a Mahasangam.
 Special episodes aired daily from 16–29 November 2020.
 A crossover episode showed Vaanathai Pola which was a Mahasangam.
 A special episode was named Kadhatthal Galatta.
 A special episode was named Thillu Mullu.
 A special episode was named Aval Varuvaala.
 A special episode was named Ethirparatha Thiruppam.

Dubbed version

References

External links 
 

Sun TV original programming
Tamil-language romance television series
2020s Tamil-language television series
2020 Tamil-language television series debuts
Tamil-language television shows
Television shows set in Tamil Nadu